The Chapekar Brothers, Damodar Hari Chapekar (25 June 1869 – 18 April 1898), Balkrishna Hari Chapekar (1873 – 12 May 1899, also called Bapurao) and Vasudeo Hari Chapekar (1880 – 8 May 1899), also spelt Wasudeva or Wasudev, were Indian revolutionaries involved in assassinating W. C. Rand, the British Plague Commissioner of Pune, after the public of Pune was frustrated with the vandalism from the officers and soldiers appointed by him, in late 19th century. Mahadev Vinayak Ranade was also an accomplice in the assassination.

The brothers initially belonged to Chapa, a small hamlet named Chinchwad in the city of Pune, India. When the bubonic plague hit India in 1896-97, the government had set up a Special Plague Committee for managing the pandemic, whose commissioner was Walter Charles Rand, an Indian Civil Services officer. Troops were brought in to deal with the emergency. Despite orders from the government to pay heed to religious sentiments, Rand appointed over 800 officers and soldiers - the measures employed included entry into private houses, stripping and examination of occupants (including women) by British officers in public, evacuation to hospitals and segregation camps and preventing movement from the city. Some of these officers also vandalized properties and religious symbols. These measures were considered oppressive by the populace of Pune and complaints were ignored by Rand. Thus, to put an end to the injustice borne by the people of Pune, the Chapekar brothers shot Rand, and his military escort Lieutenant Ayerst, on 22 June 1897.

On 22 June 1897, the Diamond Jubilee of the coronation of Queen Victoria, Rand and his military escort Lt. Ayerst were shot while returning from the celebrations at Government House. Both died, Ayerst on the spot and Rand of his wounds on 3 July. The Chapekar brothers and two accomplices (Mahadev Ranade and Shathe [First-name not known]) were charged with the murders in various roles, as well as the shooting of two informants and an attempt to shoot a police officer. All three brothers were found guilty and hanged, an accomplice was dealt with similarly, and another, then a schoolboy, was sentenced to ten years' rigorous imprisonment.

Family history

Damodar, Balkrishna and Vasudeo Chapekar hailed from Chinchwad, then a village
near the former Peshwa capital Pune, in the present day Indian state of Maharashtra. Damodar the eldest, was born in 1869 
The brothers' grandfather, Vinayak Chapekar,  was the head of an extended family which consisted of the brothers parents, Dwarka and Hari, and  about twenty members including  six uncles, two aunts, and two grandmothers. The family was wealthy at the time of Damodar's birth, earlier having had a turnover of lakhs of rupees.

With passage of time, mainly on account of Vinayak Chapekar's independent spirit and ways which made him incapable of submitting himself to government service, and his many unsuccessful business ventures, the family gradually sank into poverty. At one time when Damodar Hari was a young boy, the family, consisting of a party of twenty five travellers, went on a pilgrimage to Kashi, with two servants and three carts. Damodar remembers the death of his elder sister at Gwalior.

Damodar recalls that their family rose to richness which was a result of this pilgrimage; he refutes it, and is thankful to his grandfather for the opportunity he had of drinking the waters of the Ganga – Ganges, bathing in it, giving alms and touching the feet of Kashivishveshwara.

The brothers' father, Hari, was sent to Poona High School up to 6th standard, after which a Shastri was deputed to teach him Sanskrit at home so as to prepare him in the profession of a kirtankar. Hari Chapekar's brothers were taught to play musical instruments so that they could accompany him during his performance.

The taking up of the profession of a kirtankar by Hari was regarded with disapproval by his caste men and friends of the family, considering the status and antiquity of the family. Vinayak Hari's brothers too looked down on the profession and left it, leaving the house, going their own ways.

Even Vinayak Chapekar left the house for the then Maratha capitals of Indore and Dhar, he worked there as a writer, he had an excellent Balbodh and Modi hand. He subsequently stopped speaking any language but Sanskrit, became careless in dress, stopped interaction with others as far as possible, and started to beg on the streets. Other members of the family faced poverty too, and were forced to feed themselves at charity kitchens.

Hari Chapekar died and was cremated on the banks of Kshipra, sixteen miles from Indore. Hari Vinayak and his family were at Nagpur then but could not attend the funeral, as they were too poor to pay for the journey. Hari Chapekar's wife too was alone when she died, Hari's poverty prevented him from being with his parents when they died. Hari Vinayak's brothers too went their own ways, only one brother staying back in their ancestral home.

Growing up with their Kirtankar father 
Hari Vinayak was left to fend for his family on his own, he did not have the means to hire professional musicians to accompany him during his kirtan, so he trained his children to do so.

The father and children became proficient in their art and were admired for their work. The Chapekar brothers received little formal education, but the "company of good people, hearing of kirtans, travelling, witnessing darbars of great princes and seeing assemblies of eminent scholars" was a source of knowledge far more enriching than a few examinations passed in school", writes Damodar Hari in his autobiography.
Hari Vinayak, father of the Chapekar brothers is credited to have authored Satyanarayanakatha, of the Skandapurana, a Sanskrit text with translations.

The 1897 Bubonic plague in Pune
 
Pune, was a very important military base with a large cantonment during the British colonial rule. The cantonment had a significant European population of soldiers, officers, and their families. A number of public health initiatives were undertaken during this period ostensibly to protect the Indian population, but mainly to keep Europeans safe from the periodic epidemics of diseases like Cholera, bubonic plague, small pox, etc. The action took form in vaccinating the population and better sanitary arrangements. Given the vast cultural differences, and at times the arrogance of colonial officers, these health  measures often led to public anger. However, the heavy handedness particularly bad in 1897, during the bubonic plague epidemic in the city. By the end of February 1897, the epidemic was raging with a mortality rate twice the norm (657 deaths or 0.6% of the city population), and half the city's population had fled. A Special Plague Committee was formed under the chairmanship of W.C. Rand, an Indian Civil Services officer. He brought European troops to deal with the emergency. The heavy handed measures he employed included forcibly entering peoples' homes, at times in the middle of the night and removing infected people and digging up floors, where it was believed in those days, the plague bacillus bacteria resided. It was also required of the principal occupant of a house or a building to report all deaths and all illnesses suspected to be plague. Funerals were declared unlawful until the deaths were registered. The Committee had the right to mark special grounds for giving funeral to corpses suspected to have succumbed from plague, and prohibit use of any other place for the purpose. Disobedience of the orders would subject the offender to criminal prosecution. The work of the committee began on 13 March and ended on 19 May. The total estimated plague mortality was 2091. These measures were deeply unpopular.Nationalist leader Bal Gangadhar Tilak fulminated against the measures in his newspapers, Kesari and Maratha. The resentment culminated in Rand and his military escort being shot dead by the Chapekar brothers on 22 June 1897.The assassination led to a re-evaluation of public health policies. This led even Tilak to support the vaccination efforts later in 1906.

Diverging opinions of the British measures

In his report on the administration of the Puna plague, Rand wrote, "It is a matter of great satisfaction to the members of the Plague Committee that no credible complaint that the modesty of a woman had been intentionally insulted was made either to themselves or to the officers under whom the troops worked". He also writes that closest watch was kept on the troops employed on plague duty and utmost consideration was shown for the customs and traditions of the people.

A missionary, Rev. Robert P. Wilder, quoted in a contemporary New York Times article, asserted that the cause of plague was native practices such as going bare-foot, the distrust of the natives about the government segregation camps; further, that houses have been shut up with corpses inside, and search parties have been going around to unearth them. The same article included reported rumours that the plague has been caused by grain hoarded for twenty years by the banias or grocers being sold in the market, while others felt it was Queen Victoria's curse for the daubing of her statue with tar.

In contrast to the above British accounts, accounts based on local Indian sources quote, among others, Narasimha Chintaman Kelkar as stating that the appointment of military officers introduced an element of severity and coercion in the house searches, the highhandedness of the government provoked the people of Puna, and some soldiers were beaten in Rasta Peth locality. 
 "[British soldiers] either, through ignorance or impudence, would mock, indulge in monkey tricks, talk foolishly, intimidate, touch innocent people, shove them, enter any place without justification, pocket valuable items, etc.."

His close associate, Bal Gangadhar Tilak, wrote: "Her Majesty the Queen, the Secretary of State and his Council, should not have issued the orders for practising tyranny upon the people of India without any special advantage to be gained. ...[T]he government should not have entrusted the execution of this order to a suspicious, sullen and tyrannical officer like Rand.

Gokhale alleged, while on a visit to Britain, that British soldiers "let loose on the town" of Pune were ignorant of Indians' language, customs, and sentiments. Moreover, he claimed – in marked contradiction to Rand's above-quoted statement – to be in possession of reliable reports regarding the rape of two women, one of whom committed suicide rather than live with shame.

In Independent India, a Maharashtra government agency published school textbook describes the Pune plague as follows, In 1897, there was an epidemic of plague in Poona. To control the epidemic, an officer named Mr. Rand was appointed. He used tyrannical methods and harassed the people.

The shooting of Rand
On 22 June 1897, the Diamond Jubilee of the coronation of Queen Victoria was celebrated in Pune. In his autobiography Damodar Hari writes that he believed the jubilee celebrations would cause Europeans of all ranks to go to the Government House, and give them the opportunity to kill Rand. The brothers Damodar Hari and Balkrishna Hari selected a spot of Ganeshkhind road, by side of a yellow bungalow to shoot at Rand. Each armed with a sword and a pistol. Balkrishna in addition carried a hatchet. They reached Ganeshkhind, they saw what looked like Rand's carriage pass by, but they let it go, not being sure, deciding to attack him on his way back. They reached Government House at 7.00 – 7.30 in the evening, the sun had set and darkness began to set in. A large number of people had gathered to witness the spectacle at the Government House. There were bonfires on the hills. The swords and the hatchets they carried made movement without raising suspicion difficult, so they cached them under a stone culvert near the bungalow. As planned, Damodar Hari waited at the gate of the Government House, and as Rand's carriage emerged, ran 10 – 15 paces behind it. As the carriage reached the yellow bungalow, Damodar made up the distance, and called out "Gondya ala re"(“Gondya has come,” or “here is Gondya”), a predetermined signal for Balkrishna to take action. Damodar Hari undid the flap of the carriage, raised it and fired from a distance of about a span. It was originally planned that both would shoot at Rand, so as to ensure that Rand would not live, however Balkrishna Hari lagged behind and Rand's carriage rolled on, Balkrishna Hari meanwhile on the suspicion that the occupants of the following carriage were whispering to each other, fired at the head of one of them from behind. Lieutenant Ayerst, Rand's military escort who was riding in the following carriage died on the spot, Rand was taken to Sassoon Hospital where he succumbed to his injuries 3 July 1897.

Damodar Hari was arrested in connection with the above, on the basis of information given by the Dravid brothers. In his statement, recorded on 8 October 1897, Damodar Hari, said that atrocities like the pollution of sacred places and the breaking of idols were committed by European soldiers at the time of house searches in Pune, during the plague. Chapekar tells that they wanted to take revenge of this. His statement was treated as a confession and he was charged under section 302 of the Indian Penal Code, tried and hanged, on 18 April 1898. Balkrishna Hari absconded, and could be found only in January 1899, betrayed by a friend. Police informants: the Dravid brothers, were eliminated by Vasudeo Hari, Mahadev Vinayak Ranade and Khando Vishnu Sathe, who were arrested in their attempt to shoot police chief constable Rama Pandu later the same evening, of 9 February 1899. All were subsequently apprehended and tried. There the Chapekar brothers Balkrishna Hari, Vasudeo Hari, and Ranade were sentenced to death and executed by the gallows, Vasudev Hari: 8 May 1899, Mahadeva Vinayak Ranade: 10 May 1899, Balkrishna Hari :12 May 1899. Sathe, though a juvenile, was sentenced to 10 years' Rigorous Imprisonment.

Coverage of the incident by international press
An article, published in The New York Times, dated 4 October 1897, reports the arrest of Damodar Chapekar Deccani, and 28 others, Ayerst's and Rand's slayers. This article states that Deccani is Damodar's last name and refers to him as such. It also terms him an advocate. Another dated 4 November 1897, reports the incident and the subsequent trial, it calls Damodar Chapekar a Brahmin lawyer. The former article says that Damodar became embittered with Europeans as he was refused enlistment in the army, by the authorities in Shimla. Both articles also mention Damodar's admission of an earlier incident of tarring of Queen Victoria's statue. On 2 February 1898, The New York Times reported the death sentence passed on Damodar. The Sydney Morning Herald, dated 13 February 1899, reports that a brother of Damodar Hari, who was sentenced to death for the shooting to death of Poona Plague Commissioner and Lt. Ayerst, fired upon a native police officer. A connection between the shooting of the Dravid brothers on the streets of Poona is also mentioned with the shooting. It further states that Chapekar boasted of murder the Dravids and also named an accomplice, Ranade. It also reports the arrest of Chapekar and Ranade.

In popular culture
The 1979 Indian Marathi-language film, 22 June 1897, covers events prior to the assassination, the act and its aftermath. The Hindi film Chapekar Brothers (film) was released in 2016 covering the same historical events.

An Indian web television series  about the brothers in Marathi, Gondya Ala Re, was released in 2019 on Zee5.

Notes

References 

Indian independence activists from Maharashtra
Indian independence activists
People from Maharashtra
Marathi people
People from Pimpri-Chinchwad